Rotshidzwa Tyson Muleka (born 18 February 1992) is a South African soccer player who plays as a goalkeeper for South African Premier Division side Black Leopards.

References

Living people
1992 births
South African soccer players
Association football goalkeepers
Baroka F.C. players
Black Leopards F.C. players
South African Premier Division players
National First Division players